José Roma (1784–1847) was a painter from Spain, active in Valencia and mainly painting still life floral arrangements.

External links
 Valencia Art exhibit.

1784 births
1847 deaths
People from Valencia
19th-century Spanish painters
19th-century Spanish male artists
Spanish male painters
Spanish floral still life painters